"Tout près du bonheur" (meaning "So Close to Happiness") is a duet between Marc Dupré and Celine Dion, released as a music download on 11 April 2006 in Quebec, Canada. It is the fourth single from Dupré's debut album Refaire le monde, released on 18 October 2005.

Background and release
"Tout près du bonheur" was composed in 2000 by Dion for Dupré and Anne-Marie Angelil's wedding. Dion performed it after the ceremony. During the recording of his first album in 2005, Dupré asked Dion for permission to cover the song. The mother-in-law accepted it at once and recorded background vocals. Tino Izzo produced the track.

Dupré collaborated with Dion already in the past. He was the opening act for her concerts at the Paris Olympia in 1994. They also performed a live duet in April 2002 on "Sous le vent." It was during the widely popular Quebec karaoke game show, La fureur, held at the Bell Centre in Montreal and broadcast on Canadian Broadcasting Corporation.

There are two recorded versions of "Tout près du bonheur." First can be found on Dupré's debut album, released in 2005. Second one, rock version, was released as a radio and digital download in Quebec in 2006. There is also third but only live version of that song. It was performed on 30 April 2006 by both artists at the Gala Artists in Quebec and featured more vocals from Dion (a whole second verse). On 22 December 2006, Dion and Dupré performed the latter version also during his concert at the Lionel-Groulx Theater in Sainte-Thérèse, Quebec, and later during Dion's historic performance in front of 250,000 spectators to celebrate Quebec's 400th anniversary, which was included on Céline sur les Plaines DVD.

The music video was supposed to be shot in the Mojave Desert but because of Dion's health conditions it was directed 8 May 2006 at The Colosseum at Caesars Palace, Las Vegas by Ivan Grbovic. 

"Tout près du bonheur" topped the Quebec radio charts in June 2006 for three weeks. 

On 23 October 2006, Dion and Dupré won a SOCAN Award as composers of "Tout près du bonheur."

Later Dupré wrote music for "On s'est aimé à cause," a song which appeared on Dion's 2007 album D'elles. This track was also produced by Tino Izzo.

Track listing and formats
Canadian promotional CD single
"Tout près du bonheur" (Radio Remix Version) – 3:51
"Tout près du bonheur" (Rock Remix Version) – 3:51

Charts

References

Celine Dion songs
2006 singles
French-language songs
Male–female vocal duets
Songs written by Marc Dupré
Songs written by Celine Dion
2006 songs